is a Japanese politician of the Liberal Democratic Party, a member of the House of Representatives in the Diet (national legislature) representing the Second District of Okayama Prefecture. A native of Nishiawakura, Okayama and graduate of the University of Tokyo he joined the Ministry of International Trade and Industry in 1980, attending Princeton University in the United States while in the ministry. At age 37, he was the deputy director in MITI's Industrial Policy Bureau. After leaving the ministry in 1998, he was elected for mayor of Okayama, Okayama in 1999, serving for two terms. In 2005 he was elected to House of Representatives for the first time.  He represents the 2nd District of Okayama Prefecture, which includes the city of Okayama.

References

External links 
 Official website in Japanese.

Members of the House of Representatives (Japan)
Mayors of places in Japan
Koizumi Children
University of Tokyo alumni
Princeton University alumni
People from Okayama Prefecture
Living people
1956 births
Liberal Democratic Party (Japan) politicians